Biedenkopf is a spa town in western Hesse, Germany with a population of 13,491 (2020).

Geography

Location 
The town of Biedenkopf lies in the west of Marburg-Biedenkopf district. Ringed by mountains reaching up to above sea level – the Sackpfeife in the Rothaargebirge reaches this height – the town lies on the upper reaches of the river Lahn. Together with 18 other municipalities, it belongs to the Lahn-Dill-Bergland region.

Neighbouring communities 
Clockwise from the north, the following towns and communities border on Biedenkopf: the towns of Hatzfeld and Battenberg in Waldeck-Frankenberg district, in Marburg-Biedenkopf district the towns of Münchhausen am Christenberg and Wetter and the communities of Dautphetal and Breidenbach as well as the towns of Bad Laasphe and Bad Berleburg in Siegen-Wittgenstein district.

Divisions within the town 
 Biedenkopf
 Breidenstein
 Dexbach
 Eckelshausen
 Engelbach
 Katzenbach
 Kombach
 Wallau
 Weifenbach

Christian communities 
 Evangelical-Lutheran congregation of Biedenkopf
 Parish of St. Josef Biedenkopf (Roman Catholic)
 Free Evangelical Congregation of Biedenkopf
 New Apostolic Congregation of Biedenkopf

Politics

Town council 

Biedenkopf's town council consists of 37 seats. At the last election in 2011, the seats were apportioned thus:
 CDU: 10 seats
 SPD: 14 seats
 FDP: 1 seat
 Bürgerblock Biedenkopf: 7 seats
 UBL Wallau: 5 seats

The CDU and SPD form a grand coalition.

Town partnerships 
 La Charité-sur-Loire, France
 Oostduinkerke, Belgium
 Wépion-sur-Meuse, Belgium
 Neustadt an der Orla, Germany
 Cogoleto, Italy
 Kecskéd, Hungary

Culture and sightseeing

Museums 
 Schloss Biedenkopf (stately home) with Hinterlandmuseum
 Schartenhof Eckelshausen
 Wallau village museum
 Dorfstube Engelbach
 Private Holder tractor museum in Engelbach
 Schenkbarsches Haus

Sport 
 Indoor swimming pool at the community centre
 Lahnauenbad (outdoor swimming pool)
 Indoor and outdoor swimming pool in Wallau community
 4 sports halls in the main community (Großsporthalle, Stadtschule, Lahntalschule, Jahn-Halle)
 Großsporthalle (sports hall) in Wallau, gymnasium in Weifenbach
 Aue-Tenniscenter
 Franz-Josef-Müller-Stadion (stadium)
 Sports field in Wallau, football pitches in most communities
 Riding hall
 Shooting range
 Trimm-Dich-Pfad ("Trim-Yourself-Path")
 Perfstausee (reservoir) with bathing beach

Regular events 
 Every seven years, the town holds a Grenzgang in which people walk around the borders of the town's forest.

Culinary specialities 
The Kartoffelbraten – or popularly the Brott – is a typical Biedenkopf culinary custom which has grown out of the autumn potato harvest. In many places in the forest, traditionally in early autumn, the tasty tuber is cooked in the glow of a heap of charcoal made from freshly felled beechwood. The unpeeled potato tastes best with butter, salt, liverwurst and salad. For the Biedenkopfer Kartoffelbraten, only three kinds of salad are traditionally served: radish salad, onion salad and herring salad.

Economy and infrastructure

Planning 
In the 2001 Middle Hesse Regional Plan, the former district seat (Kreisstadt) Biedenkopf is designated the middle centre in the rural area. The town is part of the Marburg - Dautphetal - Biedenkopf - (Bad Laasphe) development belt. This belt's job is to open up the region, to make possible an exchange of goods and services between middle centres as well as to connect the region to the high centre of Marburg and to the long-distance transportation network. Building on public transport is thus given special importance.

Moreover, there exists a local transport and population belt, Dillenburg - Steffenberg - Breidenbach – Biedenkopf, with a regional connective function. Together with Dautphetal and Breidenbach, Biedenkopf is described as a commercial hub.

Transport

Highways 
 Bundesstraße 62
 Bundesstraße 253
 Bundesstraße 453

Alongside the two regional buslines 481 (RKH line 5301) and 491 (RKH line 5356), other local buses serve the town.

Railway 
The Obere Lahntalbahn is the only railway line that serves the town. In May 1987, passenger traffic towards Dillenburg on the Scheldetalbahn was discontinued. Minor freight services persisted for a few years serving the Buderus firm until December 2002.

Biedenkopf is joined by the Obere Lahntalbahn (a Deutsche Bahn line) to Erndtebrück in Siegen-Wittgenstein district and the town of Marburg by way of Bad Laasphe, Dautphetal and Lahntal. The railway serves three stations in Biedenkopf: Wallau, Biedenkopf-Schulzentrum and Biedenkopf.

Established enterprises 
In Biedenkopf and its outlying communities, machine manufacture and mould making have always been strongly represented. Among the companies in this business are Meissner AG (model- and toolmaking), Banss Schlacht- und Fördertechnik GmbH and CFS (packing systems, formerly Krämer & Grebe Tiromat). Furthermore, processing synthetic products is another of the town's industries, represented by, among others, the firm Elkamet.

Media 
The daily newspaper with the greatest market share in Biedenkopf is the Hinterländer Anzeiger owned by the Lahn-Dill newspaper group (flagship paper: the Wetzlarer Neue Zeitung). A local section can also be found for the old district of Biedenkopf in Marburg's Oberhessische Presse, itself a regional paper.

Public institutions 
 Police station
 Branch of the Marburg-Biedenkopf State Council Office (with vehicle licensing, job centre, folk high school, building and youth office as well as the authority responsible for foreigners)
 Financial office (branch of the Marburg-Biedenkopf financial office)
 Employment agency (branch of the Wetzlar office)
 Kreishandwerkerschaft Biedenkopf (district craftsmen's association)
 Branch of the Dillenburg Industrie- und Handelskammer (IHK, Chamber of Industry and Commerce)
 Medienzentrum Biedenkopf – one of three places in Marburg-Biedenkopf where educational media can be rented
 Pension office of the Biedenkopf Evangelical Deaconate.

Biedenkopf also has a DRK hospital with 110 beds. Alongside surgery, the areas of specialization include gynaecology and obstetrics, internal medicine, and urology.

Education 
 Gymnasium (Lahntalschule Biedenkopf)
 Real- and Hauptschule (Stadtschule Biedenkopf)
 Professional schools
 Biedenkopf primary school
 Primary school and Hauptschule (Mittelpunktschule Wallau)
 Folk high school

State institutions 
Since 1953, Biedenkopf has been host to a Hessischer Rundfunk VHF and television transmission facility on the Sackpfeife. The antenna are borne by a 210-m guyed steel-lattice mast with a diagonal cross-section measure of 1.8 m. Its position is 50°57'8"N, 8°32'1"E.

Personalities

Sons and daughters of the town 
 Karl-Heinz Schneider, bearer of the "Verdienstkreuzes am Bande" (bestowed 28 April 2004)
 Wilhelm Henkel, bearer of the "Verdienstkreuzes am Bande" (bestowed 9 January 2004)
 Gretel Henkel, bearer of the "Verdienstmedaille" (bestowed 9 January 2004)

References

External links 

 
 Wallau/Lahn community
 
  further links
 Official Grenzgang page

Marburg-Biedenkopf
Spa towns in Germany